Niren Bhatt is a screenwriter and lyricist across mediums. He has written films like Bala, Serious Men, Made in China, Ventilator, Wrong Side Raju and Bey Yaar. His recent work includes Bhediya, starring Varun Dhawan. He is the writer of web series like Asur, Ray and Inside edge. He is also the writer of the popular TV show, Taarak Mehta Ka Ooltah Chashmah. He has written songs for over 30 films as a lyricist.

Filmography

Films 

Bhatt has contributed in the following films & Web series/TV Series in various departments:

TV series/Web Series

Accolades
65th Filmfare Awards
Filmfare Award for Best Dialogue - Nominated

References

External links 
 

Gujarati people
Indian lyricists
Year of birth missing (living people)
Living people